Allophylus rhomboidalis is a species of plant in the family Sapindaceae. It is found in French Polynesia and Pitcairn.

See also
Flora of Tubuai

References

rhomboidalis
Flora of the Pitcairn Islands
Flora of the Tubuai Islands
Least concern plants
Taxonomy articles created by Polbot